DeVilbiss Automotive Refinishing is an American manufacturer of spray guns, airbrushes, and related products for paint and lacquer coating applications. The company was founded in 1907 and is based in Scottsdale, Arizona, US.

References

External link
company homepage

Manufacturing companies based in Ohio
Manufacturing companies established in 1907
1907 establishments in Ohio